The 2004 UCI Track Cycling World Championships were the World Championship set of events for track cycling. Both men's and women's events took place, with nine men's events and six women's events. They took place in Melbourne, Australia from 26 to 30 May 2004. 43 nations competed, and competitors from 19 nations were awarded medals.

Medal table

Medal summary

External links
World Track Championships - CM Melbourne, Australia, May 26-30, 2004 Cycling News

 
Uci Track Cycling World Championships, 2004
Track cycling
UCI Track Cycling World Championships by year
Sports competitions in Melbourne
May 2004 sports events in Europe